Eduardo de Guzmán Espinosa (19 June 1908 in Villada – 25 July 1991 in Madrid) was a Spanish journalist and writer, popular during the Second Spanish Republic. He was known for his press reports and journalism during the Spanish Civil War following the anarcho-syndicalist ideology.

References 

1908 births
1991 deaths
Spanish journalists
Spanish writers